Shamsabad (also Romanized as Shamsābād) is a village in Mazul Rural District, in the Central District of Nishapur County, Razavi Khorasan Province, Iran. At the 2006 census, its population was 20, in 7 families.

References 

Populated places in Nishapur County